Yanki or Yankı (Turkish for echo) may refer to:

 Yankī, a type of delinquent youth in Japan

People with the name
 Yankı Erel (born 2000), Turkish tennis player
 Yanki Margalit (born 1962), Israeli entrepreneur
 Yanki Tauber (born 1965), American Jewish-Hasidic scholar
 Semiha Yankı (born 1958), Turkish pop music singer

See also
 Yankee (disambiguation)

Turkish-language surnames
Turkish masculine given names